HMS Renard was a schooner of the Royal Navy, built by John Cuthbert, Millers Point, New South Wales and launched 16 January 1873.

She commenced service on the Australia Station at Sydney in 1873 for anti-blackbirding operations in the South Pacific and later hydrographic surveys around Chesterfield Islands, Fiji and the Russell Islands. She ran aground on an uncharted reef in late 1874. Her captain was deemed blameless in the matter of the grounding. Under the command of Captain Pugh, she was engaged in anti-blackbirding operations in 1876 and visited Nukufetau in the Ellice Islands in search of Bully Hayes, who was notorious for his blackbirding activities.

She was paid off in 1883 and sold. She was then employed in the Soloman Island trade.

Citations

References
Bastock, John (1988), Ships on the Australia Station, Child & Associates Publishing Pty Ltd; Frenchs Forest, Australia. 

1873 ships
Ships built in New South Wales
Victorian-era naval ships of the United Kingdom
Maritime incidents in 1874